Tom Doherty (born April 23, 1935) is an American publisher and the founder of the science fiction and fantasy book publisher Tor Books. He started as a salesman for Pocket
Books and rose to be Division Sales Manager. From there, he went to Simon & Schuster as National Sales Manager, then became publisher of paperbacks at Grosset & Dunlap, including Tempo Books, in 1969. In 1975, he became publisher for Ace Books. In 1979, he left Ace to establish his own company, Tom Doherty Associates, publishing under the Tor Books imprint starting in 1980, which has grown to become the largest publisher of science fiction and fantasy in the United States.

TDA became a subsidiary of St. Martin's Press in 1987; both are now separate divisions of Macmillan Publishers, ultimately owned by Holtzbrinck Publishers. Doherty continues as Chairman of Tom Doherty Associates, publishing under the Tor, Forge, Tordotcom, Starscape, Tor Teen, and Nightfire imprints.

Awards 

In 1993 Tom was the recipient of the Skylark Award (also known as the Edward E. Smith Memorial Award) awarded by the New England Science Fiction Association for outstanding contribution to the field of science fiction. Tom received a "Lifetime Achievement Award" at the 2005 World Fantasy Convention, and in 2006, the Raymond Z. Gallun Award for outstanding contribution to the genre of science fiction. In 2007, Tom received the Lariat Award from the Western Writers of America for contribution to literacy; and was honored with a proclamation from Charles B. Rangel, Chairman of the Committee on Ways and Means of the House of Representatives of the United States Congress, for outstanding leadership to enhance and provide literacy programs throughout the nation. In 2009 Tom received the Solstice Award from the Science Fiction and Fantasy Writers of America for his significant impact on the science fiction and fantasy landscape; and in 2017 the Thriller Legend Award from the International Thriller Writers, an award honoring an icon in the industry.

References

1935 births
Living people
American speculative fiction publishers (people)
American speculative fiction editors